Gerda Maria Tirén, née Rydberg (11 January 1858, Stockholm - 9 October 1928, Länna Parish, Uppland) was a Swedish painter and illustrator. She did landscapes from France and Sweden, children's portraits, and genre scenes. Her illustrations were often featured in the magazine  (Santa Claus).

Biography
Her father, Carl Henrik Rydberg (1820-1902) was a writer and journalist. Her mother, Emma (1820-1899), was the granddaughter of portrait painter and sculptor Jonas Forsslund.  

She studied at the Technical School in Stockholm and at the Royal Swedish Academy of Fine Arts. Thanks to a scholarship, she was able to study in Paris and at the artists' colony in Grez-sur-Loing. 

In 1884, she married the painter, Johan Tirén, who she had met in Paris; most likely at a private art academy operated by Edvard Perséus. Johan's younger brother  was also a painter, in addition to being an ethnographer and folklorist. 

She held numerous exhibitions, including ones at the Paris Salon (1885), the Norrköping Exhibition of Art and Industry (1906) and the Liljevalchs konsthall (1917). Together with her children, Nils and Stina, she created an exhibition at the Konstnärshuset in 1918.  

She illustrated several other books in that series, including Life in the Country by Fritz Reuter,  as well as drawing designs for Christmas and Easter cards.

References

Other sources 

Svenskt konstnärslexikon part V, pg. 455, Allhems Förlag, Malmö. 
 Gerda Tirén @ the Konstnärslexikonett Amanda

External links

More works by Tirén @ ArtNet

1858 births
1928 deaths
Swedish women illustrators
Swedish women painters
Swedish children's book illustrators
Artists from Stockholm